Don't Drink the Water is a 1994 American made-for-television comedy film written and directed by Woody Allen, based on his 1966 play.  This is the second filmed version of the play, after a 1969 theatrical version starring Jackie Gleason left Allen dissatisfied.

The story revolves around a family of American tourists (played by Allen, Julie Kavner, and Mayim Bialik) that gets trapped behind the Iron Curtain.  Michael J. Fox plays the American ambassador's son.

This is the second time Allen wrote and performed in a movie made for television (Men of Crisis: The Harvey Wallinger Story was filmed in 1971 but was never broadcast). The film was not well-received by critics.

Cast

Reception
Don't Drink the Water has a 44% approval rating on Rotten Tomatoes. In 2016 film critics Robbie Collin and Tim Robey ranked it as one of the worst movies by Woody Allen.

Year-end lists 
 Honorable mention – Jeff Simon, The Buffalo News

References

External links

1994 television films
1994 films
Films directed by Woody Allen
American comedy television films
1994 comedy films
Films with screenplays by Woody Allen
Films produced by Robert Greenhut
Films produced by Jean Doumanian
Films produced by Letty Aronson
American films based on plays
1990s English-language films
1990s American films